is a studio album by Japanese American hip hop artist Shing02. It was released on Mary Joy Recordings on June 18, 2008. It peaked at number 42 on the Oricon Albums Chart.

Track listing

Personnel

Primary artist
 Shing02 - vocals, drums , chimes , guitar , triangle , Fender Rhodes , piano , synth , Farfisa , vibraslap , bass , organ , keyboards , timpani , xylophone , vibraphone , Magnus , written by, orchestrated by

Musicians
 Fukashi Adachi – acoustic guitar , electric guitar 
 David Boyce – saxophone 
 Caveman – trumpet , Fender Rhodes , bass 
 Dawgisht – synth , piano , vibraphone 
 Doc Max – Fender Rhodes , guitar , synth , bass 
 David Ewell – upright bass 
 Philip Gelb – shakuhachi 
 Goro – didgeridoo 
 Junzo – electric guitar , acoustic guitar , claves 
 Eiji Kachi – khoomii 
 KND – steel pan , Koto 
 Mr. Buckner – bass 
 Myokei – bells , cymbal 
 Kakushin Nishihara – biwa 
 Tetsu Nishiuchi – saxophone  
 Yoshihiro Sako – bass 
 Tetsufumi Saito – trombone 
 Ras Takashi – melodica 
 Ayumi Takeshima – violin , violin sample 
 Wesley Ueunten – sanshin 
 Motoki Yamaguchi – drum fills , drums , triangle , Korg Synth , sabar , metronome , cymbal , piano , bird call , tambourine 

Vocalists
 Ajo – vocals 
 Tadanobu Asano – vocals 
 Bobimon – additional vocals 
 Chiyori – vocals 
 Fuyu – vocals 
 Junzo – vocals 
 Emi Meyer – vocals 
 Myokei – vocals 
 Kakushin Nishihara – vocals 
 Tamurapan – vocals 
 Wesley Ueunten – vocals 

Technical personnel
 Chiyori – effects 
 Dawgisht – drum programming 
 Doc Max – drum programming 
 Ryota Hayashida - mixed by, mastered by
 Kentaro Munechika – sound effects 

Design personnel
 Junko Gosho - liner notes
 Hiraku Suzuki - design
 Ayako Yamamoto - photography by

Charts

References

External links
 
 Waikyoku at Mary Joy Recordings

2008 albums
Shing02 albums